Christine Dorothy Berg is an American radiation oncologist and physician-scientist who was chief of the early detection research group at the National Cancer Institute.

Life 
Berg completed a M.D. at the of Northwestern University School of Medicine. She completed a residency in internal medicine from 1977 to 1981 at the McGaw Medical Center. Berg conducted a fellowship in hematology and medical oncology from 1981 to 1984 at the National Institutes of Health Clinical Center. She was a resident in radiation oncology from 1984 to 1986 with MedStar Health.

As of 2004, Berg was chief of the early detection research group in the division of cancer prevention at the National Cancer Institute. In 2010, she was co-lead of the National Lung Screening Trial. Berg retired from NCI in November 2012.

References 

Living people
Year of birth missing (living people)
Place of birth missing (living people)
Feinberg School of Medicine alumni
National Institutes of Health people
American oncologists
Women oncologists
American medical researchers
Cancer researchers
Women medical researchers
21st-century American women physicians
21st-century American physicians
Physician-scientists